Ti-Anna Wang (born 1989) is a Chinese-Canadian-American dissident and daughter of Wang Bingzhang. Her father is currently imprisoned in China for political agitation.

Life
She grew up in Montreal.
In 2008, she lobbied for the release of her father.

Fred Hiatt wrote a fictional account of her efforts to free her father.
On January 9, 2019, she was denied entry to China while trying to visit her father. Despite possessing a valid visa she was deported to Jeju Island, South Korea. On January 16 she took a return flight from Seoul to Toronto that connected through Beijing. When the plane landed in Beijing, she was detained by police and sent back to South Korea.

References

External links

http://www.npr.org/2013/04/17/176779468/a-real-life-fight-for-freedom-in-nine-days
http://www.pbs.org/newshour/bb/entertainment/jan-june13/ninedays_06-07.html
http://www.genevasummit.org/speaker/70/ti_anna_wang

1989 births
Living people
Chinese dissidents
Chinese human rights activists